The Alliance for Cannabis Therapeutics (ACT) is an organization supporting medical marijuana that was founded in 1981 by Robert C. Randall and Alice O'Leary. Randall was the first person known to have successfully used medical necessity as a defense against a charge of marijuana possession in violation of the Controlled Substances Act.

History
Clare Hodges aka Elizabeth Brice founded the Alliance for Cannabis Therapeutics (ACT) in the UK after contacting the Alice O'Leary and Robert Randall in 1992 about the medical benefits of marijuana for individuals suffering from multiple sclerosis.    

The group participated in the 1986 hearings on cannabis rescheduling in the United States. ACT along with NORML petitioned for review of the final order of the Administrator of the Drug Enforcement Administration which followed the hearings. See Alliance for Cannabis Therapeutics v. DEA, 930 F.2d 936 (D.C.Cir.1991)

References

External links
Alliance for Cannabis Therapeutics.

Medicinal use of cannabis organizations based in the United States
Organizations established in 1981
1981 in cannabis